The 1996 Yosemite Valley landslide occurred on July 10, 1996, near the Happy Isles trailhead in Yosemite Valley, Yosemite National Park, Mariposa County, California.  162,000 tons of rocks and other debris fell to the ground at over 160 miles per hour.  Of the 12 campers/hikers involved in the incident, one was killed.  The landslide competes with the 1997 Merced River flood and the 2013 Rim wildfire for the designation of the worst natural disaster in Yosemite to date. The earthquake caused by the rock slide was followed almost  immediately by a sonic boom. Soon afterward a granite dust mushroom  cloud  formed over Happy Isles. The immense pressure created at the  base of  the rock slide blew down giant pine trees as if they were nothing. Afterwards the nearby campground  tables and trees  were covered with a thick coat  of granite dust.

Impacts

The first impact occurred at 18:52:28.0  Pacific Daylight Time (02:52:28 UTC), and the second at 18:52:41.6  PDT (02:52:41 UTC).

Effects
One of the impacts killed a hiker near the cliffs.

The force of the impacts was comparable to a 2.15-magnitude earthquake.  The impacts also triggered the formation of a massive dust cloud.  One witness "noted that the sky went black for six minutes as the dust raised by the cloud blocked out the late afternoon light."  The rock fall also caused the uprooting or damage of about 1,000 trees in the immediate blast zone. Structures damaged by the snapping of these trees included the Happy Isles Nature Center, a snack bar, and a bridge. On the day of the incident, the park was hosting as many as 20,000 visitors.

See also
 1997 Merced River flood
 Happy Isles

References

Geology of Yosemite National Park
Yosemite National Park
1996 natural disasters in the United States
Natural disasters in California
History of Mariposa County, California
Yosemite Valley landslide 1996
Deaths in Yosemite National Park
Yosemite Valley landslide
1996 in California